Piero Calamai (25 December 1897 – 7 April 1972) was the Italian captain of the SS Andrea Doria when it sank in July 1956 after colliding with the MS Stockholm.

Life and career
Calamai was born into a naval family. His younger brother Marco advanced to the rank of rear admiral in the Italian Navy and also had command of the Italian Naval Academy before being lost at sea in 1957.  His father Orestes founded the first naval magazine in Italy, entitled La Marina Mercantile (Merchant Navy).

Calamai began his career as a sailor in July 1916, serving as an ensign in the Royal Italian Navy. Decorated with the Silver Medal of Military Valor during World War I for bravery, he also took part in World War II with the rank of lieutenant commander of complement, earning a second Silver Medal of Military Valor. 

Following World War II, he returned to Ruolo Organico della Italia – Società di Navigazione (The Navigators' Society). He attained the rank of officer and eventually commanded 27 ships. He was assigned to the flagship SS Andrea Doria. After the sinking of the Andrea Doria, Calamai retired and even told one of his friends, "Before I used to love the sea. Now I hate it."

He died on April 7, 1972, at the age of 74, in his hometown. His last words were "are all passengers safe?" Unfortunately the captain didn't get to read a letter written almost a month earlier by John C. Carrothers, a retired US naval engineer who had become one of the leading experts in naval collisions, having studied in particular the one between the Andrea Doria and the Stockholm. Carrothers, the first to recognize the responsibility of the Third Officer of the Swedish ship, wanted to inform Calamai that the accident in which he had been the protagonist had been studied at the US Naval Academy of Annapolis. Moreover, the official publication of the U.S. Naval Institute had confirmed Carrothers' reconstruction, which rehabilitated Calamai. The letter contained expressions of very warm solidarity, stressing that it had taken more than 12 years to prove Swedish responsibility and ended as follows:
«Rest assured Captain Calamai, there are many of us who would be more than willing to serve under your command at anytime» (John C. Carrothers, letter dated 10th of March 1972)

References

External links
Andrea Doria – Tragedy and Rescue at Sea
 Andrea Doria Crew and Passenger List

1897 births
1972 deaths
Sea captains
Recipients of the Silver Medal of Military Valor
Italian military personnel of World War I
Regia Marina personnel of World War II